Samantha Monahan (born December 5, 1988 in Dumont, New Jersey) is an American professional soccer player who plays for Ballerup-Skovlunde Fodbold of the Danish Elitedivisionen.

Early life
Monahan grew up in Tucson, Arizona and attended Catalina Foothills High School, where she was a four-year starter and won three consecutive 4A state championships in 2005, 2006 and 2007.

Northern Arizona University
In 2012, she graduated with a major in Electronic Media and Film at Northern Arizona University in Flagstaff, Arizona, where she played for the Northern Arizona Lumberjacks women's soccer program from 2008-2012.  She made 70 appearances for the Lumberjacks, accumulating 13 goals and 21 assists - good for eighth and second all-time in program history, respectively - and is one of ten players in program history with multiple All-Big Sky first team selections. She led her team to its first ever NCAA tournament appearances by winning back-to-back Big Sky Conference tournament titles in 2008  and 2009, and was named first team All-Big Sky in 2010 and 2011.

Club
Monahan had a tryout with the Philadelphia Independence of the WPS in December 2011. She was asked to join the team for the final tryouts before the league was suspended before the 2012 season. The beginning of her professional career started overseas with Finnish club Ekenäs IF in 2012, before moving to FC Honka in 2013. In two seasons with Honka she had 18 goals and 18 assists and won the Finnish Cup in 2014.

In the summer of 2015, Monahan joined up with her current team, Swedish Elitettan club Östersunds DFF. In 2016 Monahan lead her team with 11 goals and 8 assists.

She played for Women's Premier Soccer League clubs Arizona Rush in 2008 and FC Tucson Women in 2015.

Playing Style

Monahan is a versatile attacking player who typically lines up as an attacking midfielder or second striker, but also has the ability to play as a striker or an outside forward in a 4-3-3 or 4-2-3-1 formation.

References

1988 births
Living people
FC Honka (women) players
Northern Arizona Lumberjacks women's soccer players
People from Dumont, New Jersey
American women's soccer players
Soccer players from Tucson, Arizona
Ekenäs IF players
Women's association football midfielders
Women's association football forwards
Women's Premier Soccer League players
Arizona Rush players
Ballerup-Skovlunde Fodbold (women) players